Splinters is a 1929 British musical comedy based on the stage revue Splinters. It was British & Dominions Film Corporation's first all-talking release filmed entirely in the UK.  The revue tells the story of the origin of the concert party Splinters created by UK soldiers in France in 1915. The film was followed by two sequels, Splinters in the Navy (1931) and Splinters in the Air (1937).

Cast
Nelson Keys
Sydney Howard as Doleful Soldier
Lew Lake as Nobbler
Hal Jones as Sergeant
Reg Stone as Drag Artist
Wilfred Temple
Carroll Gibbons as Himself, leading the HMV Orchestra
Gus Aubrey as Drag Act 
George Baker
Walter Glynne
Sidney Grantham 
Clifford Heatherley as Sergeant Miller

References

External links

Splinters (1929) at BFI Database

1929 films
British musical comedy films
British black-and-white films
1929 musical comedy films
1920s English-language films
Films directed by Jack Raymond
Films shot at Rock Studios
Films set in England
British and Dominions Studios films
Films shot at Imperial Studios, Elstree
1920s British films